Andrés Oliva (born 7 December 1948) was a former Spanish professional cyclist. Oliva was a great climber, so he ended up winning multiple Mountains Classifications. He won the Mountains Classification at the 1975 Giro d'Italia and the 1976 Giro d'Italia. Those were the only two years that Oliva raced the Giro d'Italia. In the 1975 edition Oliva finished 14th overall, that was his highest finish. Oliva also experienced success at the Vuelta a España. He won the Mountains Classification at the 1975 Vuelta a España, 1976 Vuelta a España, 1978 Vuelta a España. Oliva's highest finish at the Vuelta a España was eleventh overall, he did that in both 1978 and 1972. He retired from cycling in 1980.

References

1948 births
Living people
Spanish male cyclists
Sportspeople from the Province of Toledo
Tour de Suisse stage winners
Cyclists from Castilla-La Mancha